The 2015 Northampton Borough Council election took place on 7 May 2015 as a four-yearly public decision to elect all members of the council. This took place on the same day as other local elections and the 2015 United Kingdom general election - when there is a general election on the same day as the local elections, turnout across the country is with fewer than 1% of exceptions higher than if there is no general election.  Voters could cast between one and three votes depending on the number of councillors per ward.

Election result

|}

Ward results

The number in brackets after the ward name is the number of councillors to be elected. An asterisk after the name (*) indicates the candidate was elected. Candidates are listed in order of number of votes. The wards and the numbers of candidates to be elected were both the same as for the 2011 borough election. There were 45 seats for election in total on the borough council, as in 2011.

NOTE: Ballot Papers and Turnout missing from the official records as at 14 May 2015 for East Hunsbury, Nene Valley, Rushmills, Upton and West Hunsbury.

References

2015 English local elections
May 2015 events in the United Kingdom
2015
2010s in Northamptonshire